Phraya Phahonphonphayuhasena (29 March 1887 – 14 February 1947) (short form: Phraya Phahon), born as Phot Phahonyothin, was a Thai military leader and politician. He became the second prime minister of Siam in 1933 after ousting his predecessor in a coup d'état. He retired in 1938 after serving five years as prime minister.

Early life

Phot was born in Phra Nakhon Province (present-day Bangkok) to a Teochew Thai Chinese father, Colonel Kim Phahonyothin, and a Thai Mon mother, Chap Phahonyothin.

After attending the Chulachomklao Royal Military Academy, in 1903 he was sent by royal scholarship to study at the Prussian Military Academy (Preußische Hauptkadettenanstalt) in the town of Lichterfelde, near Berlin, Germany, where he was apparently a classmate of Hermann Göring and became acquainted with Hideki Tojo through sword duels. Phot was then sent to study at the Engineering College of Copenhagen in Denmark, he was however only able to complete one year as his scholarship funds had run out, he returned to Siam in 1912. In 1931 he was elevated to the title of Phraya Phahonphonphayuhasena by King Prajadhipok (or Rama VII) and received the rank of colonel. In 1932 he became Commander of the Royal Siamese Army.

Revolutionary leader
Phraya Phahon was an important member of a group of conspirators known as the "Four Musketeers". They were part of the Khana Ratsadon (or 'People's Party') who carried out the revolution of 1932. After 1932 coup, three factions formed among the political and military leaders of Khana Ratsadon. These were: first, the senior military faction led by Phraya Phahon; second, the junior army and navy faction led by Luang Phibunsongkhram; and third, the civilian faction led by Pridi Phanomyong. Also he, Phraya Songsuradet, and Phraya Ritthiakhaney, were served the collective military defenders of capital, de facto national government leader, exercising power behalf the king.

As the most senior Phraya Phahon was viewed as the de facto leader of the Khana Ratsadon and the revolution itself. It was Phraya Phahon who read the Declaration of the New Siamese State in the Royal Plaza that declared the end of absolute monarchy and the establishment of the constitutional Siamese state. Because of the key role he played in the revolution he was rewarded with a high position in the new government and was made a member of the new cabinet.

In March 1933 a constitutional crisis  developed in Siam over the "Yellow Cover Dossier" incident, precipitated by Pridi's draft economic plan, which contained socialist elements. Because of this, Phraya Manopakorn Nititada, the prime minister, expelled him from the cabinet and suspended the constitution. This action upset many in the People's Party who supported Pridi, including Phraya Phahon. On 15 June Phraya Phahon resigned from the cabinet citing health reasons. In truth, he and a couple of military officers planned to overthrow Phraya Mano's increasingly authoritarian government. On 20 June a bloodless coup was carried out, led by Phraya Phahon. The following day, Phraya Phahon appointed himself the second prime minister of Siam. He immediately sent a report to King Prajadhipok explaining the objectives of the coup and asked for the king's support. Reluctantly the king endorsed him. Phraya Mano was exiled to Malaysia.

Premiership

The next five years were a struggle to maintain power. In October 1933, a royalist revolt against Phraya Phahon's government, the Boworadet Rebellion, occurred only four months after his becoming prime minister. After weeks of fighting, government troops emerged victorious and Phraya Phahon was able to solidify his position. The cabinet was divided politically. The government was maintained only by the force of his personality. Luang Phibunsongkhram, a trusted confidant, became minister of defence under the new government and he began to acquire greater power and influence in preparation for his eventual ascension to the premiership.

The beginning of the end for Phraya Phahon's time as prime minister began in 1937 when a scandal erupted involving the sale of crown real estate to high-ranking officials at below-market prices. After a near collapse that year, the first direct elections for the People's Assembly took place on 7 November 1937. Those in Phraya Phahon's cabinet found themselves an ideological and political minority. After budget issues in 1938, the cabinet was forced to resign in September 1938 followed by elections in December which resulted in Luang Phibunsongkhram becoming the prime minister of Thailand.

Retirement and death
After his term as prime minister, General Phraya Phahon retired from public life, though he served as Inspector-General of the Royal Thai Armed Forces during World War II. He died in February 1947 at the age of 59 of cerebral haemorrhage. It was said that when he died, despite the fact that he had held many positions in government, his family lacked the funds to pay for his funeral. Luang Phibunsongkhram, his protege and the incumbent prime minister, stepped in to pay for the cost.

Legacy

Phahonyothin Road, which runs from Bangkok to the border of Burma in the north, is named after Phraya Phahon. Formerly known as Prachathipatai Road, Field Marshal Plaek Phibunshongkhram renamed the road in his honour. A hospital in Kanchanaburi Province, Paholpolpayuhasena Hospital is also named in his honour.

A Royal Thai Army artillery base in Lopburi Province bore the name of General Phraya Phahon until 2019 when, at the order of the king Vajiralongkorn, it was renamed King Bhumibol base. Long-standing statues of Phraya Phahon and Field Marshal Plaek Phibunsongkhram installed at the base are to be removed and replaced by a statue of King Bhumibol.

Honours

Noble titles 
 20 April 1918: Luang Sarayuth Sorasit (หลวงสรายุทธ์สรสิทธิ์)
 9 July 1924: Phra Sarayuth Sorasit (พระสรายุทธ์สรสิทธิ์)
 6 November 1931: Phraya Phahonphonphayuhasena (พระยาพหลพลพยุหเสนา)
 15 May 1942: Abolition of nobility
 15 February 1945: Title restoration. Phraya Phahonphonphayuhasena (พระยาพหลพลพยุหเสนา)

Thai Decorations 
  Knight Grand Cordon (Special Class) of the Most Exalted Order of the White Elephant
  Knight Grand Cordon (Special Class) of The Most Noble Order of the Crown of Thailand
  Knight Grand Cordon (Special Class) of The Most Illustrious Order of Chula Chom Klao

Foreign Decorations 
  Grand Cross of the Order of the German Eagle with star
  Grand Cordon of the Order of the Rising Sun
  Commander of the Order of Orange-Nassau

Notes

References

General references

 Stowe, Judith A. Siam Becomes Thailand: A Story of Intrigue. C. Hurst & Co. Publishers, 1991

External links

 Phraya Phaholphol Phayuhasena (thaigov.go.th)

Commanders-in-chief of the Royal Thai Army
People from Bangkok
Prime Ministers of Thailand
Thai politicians of Chinese descent
Thai revolutionaries
1887 births
1947 deaths
Knights Grand Cordon of the Order of Chula Chom Klao
Chulachomklao Royal Military Academy alumni
Members of the 1st House of Representatives of Thailand
Members of the 2nd House of Representatives of Thailand
Members of the 3rd House of Representatives of Thailand
Members of the 4th House of Representatives of Thailand
Members of the 5th House of Representatives of Thailand
Ministers of Defence of Thailand
People's Party (Thailand) politicians
Ministers of Finance of Thailand
Ministers of Education of Thailand
Thai people of Mon descent
Phraya
People of the Siamese revolution of 1932
Ministers of Foreign Affairs of Thailand
Ministers of Interior of Thailand
Ministers of Agriculture and Cooperatives of Thailand
Thai leaders who took power by coup